Banggai Island is the second largest of the Banggai Islands, an archipelago located at the far eastern end of Central Sulawesi, Indonesia. The largest island is Peleng, smaller islands of the group are Bowokan, Labobo, Kebongan, Kotudan, Tropettenando, Timpau, Salue Besar, Salue Kecil, Masepe, and Bangkulu.

References

Banggai Laut Regency
Landforms of Central Sulawesi
Islands of Sulawesi